Ernst Karl Eugen Koerner (3 November 1846, near Marienwerder – 30 July 1927, Berlin) was a German landscape painter.

Biography 
His father, Ernst (1794–1856) was a cloth dealer. In 1861, while still attending the public schools, he began working in the studios of Hermann Eschke, where he received most of his artistic education. He spent most of the two following decades travelling; to the North Sea, the Baltics, the Harz Mountains, France, England, Italy, Scotland and Spain. From 1873 to 1886, he made numerous trips to Egypt and the Middle East, where he created some of his best known paintings.

In 1874, he married Auguste Heyl (1855–1899), the daughter of a factory manager. They had one daughter and three sons, including the jurist, who later became a prominent Anti-Semite.

His most popular paintings depict Egyptian architecture, often backed by striking, red sunsets. Many of his works show the influence of  Eduard Hildebrandt.

Works 
Koerner became known above all for his pictures of Egypt, in which he depicted ancient Egyptian architecture, sometimes associated with blood-red sunsets. His painting was influenced by Eduard Hildebrandt.

 The Golden Horn (1873, formerly owned by Emperor Frederick III)
 Suez (1874, formerly held by the museum in Szczecin)
 Mahmudieh Canal (1885)
 Baalbek in Lebanon
 Sea off Alexandria
 Colossi of Memnon at Sunset (1879)
 Siut in Upper Egypt in the afterglow
 Excavation of the Sphinx (1887)
 Temple of Karnak
 Pyramids at Memphis
 Pyramids of Giza in the morning mood
 Acropolis in Athens
 Courtyard in Seville

References

Further reading 
 Alfred Rosenberg: "Ernst Koerner". In: Berliner Architekturwelt. 1, 1899, pp. 14–17, 234–24.
 Andreas Koerner: "Ernst Koerner (1846–1927). Ein Berliner Maler". In: Der Bär von Berlin. Vol. 53 (2004), pp. 75–94 .
 Wolfgang Kosack: Ernst Koerner, ein Berliner Orientmaler des 19. Jahrhunderts. Mit Werksverzeichnis und Themenliste seiner Gemälde. Verlag Christoph Brunner, Basel, .

External links 

 

1846 births
1927 deaths
19th-century German painters
19th-century German male artists
German landscape painters
German orientalists
People from Kwidzyn County